Neil B. Carpenter (born September 17, 1944 in Galt, Ontario) is a Canadian former pair skater. With partner Linda Ann Ward, he won a bronze medal at the Canadian Figure Skating Championships in 1963, captured a silver the following year, and competed at the 1964 Winter Olympics.

Carpenter was the head coach at the Hamilton Skating Club in Hamilton, Ontario. In August 2007, he signed a three-year contract to serve as head coach and head of skater development for the Dutch national team.

Results
pairs with Linda Ann Ward

References

1944 births
Canadian figure skating coaches
Canadian male pair skaters
Figure skaters at the 1964 Winter Olympics
Olympic figure skaters of Canada
Living people